Fuller Island is an island in the Highjump Archipelago,  long and  wide, lying  south of Thomas Island on the south side of Cacapon Inlet. It was mapped from air photos taken by U.S. Navy Operation Highjump, 1946–47, and named by the Advisory Committee on Antarctic Names for H.F. Fuller, an air crewman on the Operation Highjump seaplane commanded by D.E. Bunger which landed in this area in February 1947.

See also 
 List of antarctic and sub-antarctic islands

References

Islands of Wilkes Land